The Penser Weißhorn ((also known as the Sarner Weißhorn)) is a mountain of the Sarntal Alps in South Tyrol, Italy. Located near the Penser Joch, its summit appears almost inaccessible due to its seemingly vertical pyramidal shape, although it is a popular location for hikers, and can be climbed by the sure footed in around two hours as a mini via ferrata has been established on its south face. The view from the summit takes in the whole of the Sarntal Alps.

References 

 Alpenverein South Tyrol

External links 

Mountains of the Alps
Mountains of South Tyrol
Sarntal Alps